Eoin Mullen (born 6 August 1993) is an Irish professional racing cyclist. He competed in the sprint event at the 2013 UCI Track Cycling World Championships. As of 6 December 2013 he has the Irish national record in the flying 200 m time trial in a time of 9.834, which he rode at the second meeting of the 2013–14 UCI Track Cycling World Cup in Aguascalientes, Mexico. He rode at the 2015 UCI Track Cycling World Championships.

His brother, Paul Mullen, plays international rugby union for the United States national team.

References

External links

1993 births
Living people
Irish male cyclists